Mark Thomas Valley (born December 24, 1964) is an American actor. He is known for his roles as Brad Chase in the TV drama Boston Legal, Oliver Richard in the NBC drama Harry's Law, FBI Special Agent John Scott in the Fox sci fi series Fringe, Christopher Chance in  Fox's action drama Human Target, and Tommy Sullivan in ABC's Body of Proof.

Early life

Valley was born in Ogdensburg, New York. He is a 1987 graduate from the United States Military Academy in West Point, New York, with a degree in mathematics.

Career

Military service
He served in Berlin, where he played rugby for the U.S. military team, The Berlin Yanks Rugby Football Club. Valley saw action in Operation Desert Storm as platoon leader detailed from the 18th Engineer Brigade to the 73rd Engineer Company, 3-2 Air Defense Artillery Battalion, 7th Transportation Group.

Acting
Valley obtained his first role, on The Innocent (1993), while serving in the U.S. Army in Germany. He landed the role of "Father Pete" on Another World in 1993. He later took over the role of Jack Deveraux on the NBC Daytime soap opera Days of Our Lives from 1994 to 1997. In 2003, Valley played Detective Eddie Arlette, an American police officer in London, on the short-lived Keen Eddie.

He played Brad Chase on Boston Legal, a spinoff of the television series The Practice. Valley also appeared on the television series ER as Richard Lockhart, Abby Lockhart's ex-husband. In 2008 he appeared on Fringe, as FBI agent John Scott. Valley played the lead in Fox's drama Human Target.

In 2012, Valley joined ABC's Body of Proof as a series regular. He played Det. Tommy Sullivan, Dana Delany's love interest. He also co-starred alongside Delany in her short-lived series Pasadena in 2001.

Personal life
He has a daughter born in 1987. He married Australian actress Anna Torv, his Fringe co-star, in December 2008. In April 2010, it was reported that the couple had split several months ago.

Filmography

Awards and nominations

Boston Legal role
Nominated — Screen Actors Guild Awards for Outstanding Performance by an Ensemble in a Comedy Series shared with René Auberjonois, Ryan Michelle Bathe, Candice Bergen, Julie Bowen, Justin Mentell, Rhona Mitra, Monica Potter, William Shatner, and James Spader (2006)
Nominated — Screen Actors Guild Awards for Outstanding Performance by an Ensemble in a Drama Series shared with René Auberjonois, Candice Bergen, Craig Bierko, Julie Bowen, William Shatner, and James Spader (2007)
Nominated — Screen Actors Guild Awards for Outstanding Performance by an Ensemble in a Drama Series shared with René Auberjonois, Candice Bergen, Julie Bowen, Saffron Burrows, Christian Clemenson, Taraji P. Henson, John Larroquette, William Shatner, James Spader, Tara Summers, Gary Anthony Williams, and Constance Zimmer (2008)

Keen Eddie role
Nominated — Teen Choice Award for Choice TV Breakout Star — Male (2003)

Human Target role
Nominated — Teen Choice Award for Choice TV Actor — Action (2010)

Radio and podcast appearances
Valley appeared on Ken Reid's TV Guidance Counselor podcast on September 14, 2016.

References

External links

1964 births
Male actors from New York (state)
American male film actors
United States Army personnel of the Gulf War
American male television actors
American male voice actors
Living people
People from Ogdensburg, New York
United States Army officers
United States Military Academy alumni
American male soap opera actors
20th-century American male actors
21st-century American male actors